Ben Saunders (born 12 October 1984) is an English footballer who plays for Coalville Town.

Career
Saunders was born in Nottingham and played amateur football for Central Midlands League side Southwell City before joining Doncaster Rovers in August 2005. He joined Worksop Town on loan and then Bury where he played one match in the Football League which came in a 4–1 defeat away at Peterborough United. Saunders was then released by Doncaster and he dropped into non-league football playing for Hucknall Town, Shepshed Dynamo, Grantham Town, Stamford and Coalville Town.

References

External links

1984 births
Living people
English footballers
Association football forwards
English Football League players
Doncaster Rovers F.C. players
Worksop Town F.C. players
Bury F.C. players
Hucknall Town F.C. players
Shepshed Dynamo F.C. players
Grantham Town F.C. players
Stamford A.F.C. players
Coalville Town F.C. players